Newfoundland and Labrador v AbitibiBowater Inc, 2012 SCC 67 is a ruling by the Supreme Court of Canada dealing with whether an obligation incurred under regulatory action constitutes a claim under the Companies' Creditors Arrangement Act, thus becoming subject to a stay of proceedings.

Background
AbitibiBowater, a pulp and paper manufacturer, operated throughout the province of Newfoundland and Labrador for over a century. The company closed its paper mill in Stephenville, in 2005, and, in 2008, it announced its last operating mill, in Grand Falls-Windsor, would close in March 2009. This marked the end of the company’s active operations in the province. However, Abitibi still retained numerous property rights, assets and undertakings within Newfoundland amounting to well over $300 million. This included interests in hydroelectric facilities, surface rights and paper mills.

The company closed its paper mill in Stephenville in 2005 and announced in 2008 it would also close its plant in Grand Falls-Windsor. The Newfoundland and Labrador House of Assembly promptly passed legislation expropriating AbitibiBowater's assets in the province. This included the cancellation of "water and hydroelectric contracts and agreements" between the province and Abitibi, the cancellation of ongoing legal proceedings Abitibi had against the province and the blocking of access to Newfoundland's courts by Abitibi.

The government later learned it had accidentally expropriated the former mill property in central Newfoundland  and its environmental liabilities  as well. The province issued remediation orders against Abitibi under the Environmental Protection Act, compelling Abitibi to clean up various sites, many of them expropriated under the Abitibi Act. Abitibi had to submit a remediation plan by January 15, 2010, and the cleanup or "remediation actions" were to be completed by January 15, 2011.

Before the EPA orders were issued, Abitibi filed for protection from its creditors under the Companies' Creditors Arrangement Act (CCAA), and an initial stay order and subsequent extension order were both granted by the court. The extension order included an amendment to the initial stay order stating that the stay order would not apply to government regulatory orders.

Newfoundland argued that the EPA orders were non-monetary, and thus were not within the scope of the creditor claims process under the CCAA. It also sought a declaration that a court did not have the constitutional competence under CCAA proceedings to fetter the discretion of a Minister of a provincial Crown under a law validly enacted by that province.

The courts below
The application was dismissed by the Superior Court of Quebec. In his decision, Gascon JSC held that the EPA orders were in substance financial or monetary in nature, and were thus not exempted from the stay order previously issued. As he noted:

The Province then appealed the decision to the Quebec Court of Appeal, stating that:

 The judge of first instance disregarded the principles of federalism
 Provincial legislation operates in the insolvency context
 The CCAA cannot be interpreted to give a judge the power to immunize Abitibi from compliance with the EPA Orders or to avoid the Abitibi Act

The Court of Appeal disagreed, and supported the trial judge's contention that:

Accordingly, there was no prima facie merit to the appeal envisaged by the Province, and leave to appeal was refused.

The Province appealed to the Supreme Court of Canada, and the following constitutional questions were posed:

Is the definition of “claim” in s. 2(1) of the Companies' Creditors Arrangement Act ultra vires the Parliament of Canada or constitutionally inapplicable to the extent this definition includes statutory duties to which the debtor is subject pursuant to s. 99 of the Environmental Protection Act?
Is s. 11 of the Companies’ Creditors Arrangement Act ultra vires the Parliament of Canada or constitutionally inapplicable to the extent this section gives courts jurisdiction to bar or extinguish statutory duties to which the debtor is subject pursuant to s. 99 of the Environmental Protection Act?
Is s. 11 of the Companies’ Creditors Arrangement Act ultra vires the Parliament of Canada or constitutionally inapplicable to the extent this section gives courts jurisdiction to review the exercise of ministerial discretion under s. 99 of the Environmental Protection Act?

Decision of the SCC
The SCC ruled 7–2 that the appeal should be dismissed.

Majority opinion
In her ruling, Deschamps J held that not all orders issued by regulatory bodies are monetary in nature and thus provable claims in an insolvency proceeding, but some may be, even if the amounts involved are not quantified at the outset of the proceedings. There are three requirements that must be met for orders to be considered claims:

 there must be a debt, a liability or an obligation to a creditor
 the debt, liability or obligation must be incurred as of a specific time
 it must be possible to attach a monetary value to the debt, liability or obligation

The first two were met in this case, but the dispute was with respect to the third, and the question was whether orders that are not expressed in monetary terms can be translated into such terms. A claim may be asserted in insolvency proceedings even if it is contingent on an event that has not yet occurred.  The criterion used by courts to determine whether a contingent claim will be included in the insolvency process is whether the event that has not yet occurred is too remote or speculative. In that regard, certain indicators are available to a court to determine whether there is a provable claim in a CCAA proceeding:

 whether the activities are ongoing,
 whether the debtor is in control of the property
 whether the debtor has the means to comply with the order, and
 the CCAA court may also consider the effect that requiring the debtor to comply with the order would have on the insolvency process.

In this case, it was sufficiently certain that the Province would perform remediation work and therefore fall within the definition of a creditor with a monetary claim. As Deschamps J observed:

Because the provisions on the assessment of claims in insolvency matters relate directly to Parliament’s jurisdiction, the ancillary powers doctrine is not relevant to this case.  The interjurisdictional immunity doctrine is also inapplicable, because a finding that a claim of an environmental creditor is monetary in nature does not interfere in any way with the creditor’s activities; its claim is simply subject to the insolvency process. As Deschamps J explained:

Dissenting opinions
McLachlin CJ held that there was no “likelihood approaching certainty” that the Province would remediate the contamination itself, and therefore  except with respect to one site  the orders for remediation in this case are not claims that can be compromised. Otherwise, she agreed with the majority decision with respect to the issues relating to the division of powers.

LeBel J disagreed with McLachlin CJ's use of the "likelihood approaching certainty" test, saying he preferred Deschamps J's "sufficient certainty" test instead, as it best reflects how both the common law and the civil law view and deal with contingent claims. Applying that test, the appeal should be allowed on the basis that there is no evidence that the Province intends to perform the remedial work itself.

Impact
Newfoundland and Labrador v AbitibiBowater Inc, together with Sun Indalex Finance, LLC v United Steelworkers, were high-profile cases involving the application of the CCAA that the SCC was considering in its 20122013 term.

The ruling acknowledged the polluter pays principle but said in this case it did not give the province any special status that would move it ahead of other creditors. Friends of the Earth observed that the end result would be that taxpayers will bear much of the financial and environmental costs associated with cleaning up a polluter’s industrial sites, unless remediation orders are issued and acted upon before a company goes under. Provincial Environment Minister Tom Hedderson said the province must still do assessments for any necessary cleanups.

While the SCC did make it clear that as soon as a regulator initiates enforcement mechanisms it becomes a creditor for the purposes of an insolvency proceeding, it still left unresolved several difficult questions:

 what happens to the obligation to remediate if the environmental damage is of a type that is continuing during the insolvency proceeding and will continue after it?
 what if the remediation costs greatly exceed the value of the real property even after it is remediated?

References

Canadian insolvency case law
Supreme Court of Canada cases
2012 in Canadian case law
2012 in the environment
Canadian environmental case law